Claire Meade is a fictional character in the American dramedy series Ugly Betty, portrayed by Judith Light.

Light's performance as Claire has resulted in a Primetime Emmy Award nomination for Outstanding Guest Actress in a Comedy Series at the 59th Primetime Emmy Awards, when Claire was a recurring regular in season one. She was updated to a primary castmember in the second season.

Background
Claire is the late Bradford Meade's ex-wife and the mother of both Daniel and Alexis Meade.  In "Sofia's Choice", Claire mentioned  she and Bradford were married for 38 years (since 1969).  Claire is introduced in the episode "The Lyin', the Watch and the Wardrobe", when Daniel visits her at a rehabilitation clinic recovering from alcoholism. She tells Daniel her drinking was a result of the affair her husband had with Fey Sommers. She also tells him she and Fey went to confront Bradford and force him to choose. Soon after, Fey died, and Claire was admitted into rehab. Although she knew of the affair, she was generally unaware of what Bradford was doing behind her back.

After completing rehab, Claire and Bradford finally reconnected as a couple. Bradford planned to do his best to keep his marriage afloat while Claire tries to stay sober for Daniel's sake.

Claire, however, is showing signs she might be leaning back towards the bottle as evidenced in "Sofia's Choice". Moreover, there are hints in the wake of the arrest of her husband that Claire knows he was not the murderer, a fact which draws Betty into the mystery in later episodes; Claire reveals to Betty in the episode "Brothers" she was the actual murderer of Fey Sommers. When Claire visits Bradford with plans to confess, he is not happy about it and warns her not to go through with it.  She insists she will, however. After both Betty and lawyer Grace Chin both mention to Daniel that Claire's Aston Martin was at the scene of Fey's murder, Daniel confronts his mother and learns she tampered with Fey's brake lines and followed her for 18 miles prior to the former editrix's demise. Claire also admits to being sober at the time of the murder, saying she wanted to see her "Burn, and burn, and burn", because Fey took away the only man (Bradford) Claire ever loved in her life.

Although Daniel tries to keep Claire from going to the police until he can find a way to get her out of the situation, Claire maintains her confession and wishes to tell Grace what happened (over Daniel's objections). Grace and Daniel agree Claire could get medical help and, subsequently, receive a lighter sentence, and the pair decide to follow this course of action. Daniel's sister, Alexis ruins their plan, however, when she accuses Daniel of hiring and sleeping with Grace (who consequently recuses herself from the case), thus making it harder for Claire to receive a reasonable conviction.

When Claire fears her own words will turn on her in court, she prepares to leave the country, only to have Betty intervene after Claire calls her to bring a credit card to her hotel. Betty later brings Claire to her home in order to buy time, hopefully enough to convince Daniel's mother not to leave the country. Eventually, Betty's words convince Claire to do the right thing, and Claire calls the police and turns herself in to authorities.

While detoxing in a hospital and handcuffed to the bed, she tells Bradford that, although Meade Publications is the publisher of MODE, Claire is the actual owner of the magazine, and she reveals she has the right to keep Daniel and Alexis on board. This revelation prompts Wilhelmina Slater to attempt to manipulate her into signing a power of attorney, but Claire tells her it will never happen and MODE will remain in Meade hands.

Days later, in jail, Claire finds out Wilhelmina is sleeping with her husband. Mrs. Meade loses her mind and threatens Wilhelmina with death; Wilhelmina takes advantage of the situation, however, by injuring herself and telling Bradford his wife hired a couple of thugs "to take care of her." After hearing this, Bradford ultimately decides to divorce Claire.

In the season one finale, Claire and her inmates make plans to escape. They do so by feeding their diabetic inmate chocolate, causing the driver of the truck transporting the group to stop.  When he goes to check on the woman, they choke him with their handcuffs, and Claire grabs his gun, points it at him, and says, "This is happening!"  In the end of the finale, Claire and Yoga are seen running down the road, still handcuffed. Claire prepares to seek revenge on Wilhelmina now that she knows about Wilhelmina's plans to marry Bradford and take over Meade Publications, especially MODE.

As escaped convicts, Claire and Yoga obtained a hide out in Long Island. During this time, she seemed to have the upper hand compared to Wilhelmina hand with her knowledge of the Meade Building, as well as having people helping her elude the authorities. She also was aware of Wilhelmina Slater's attempts to keep her from reaching Bradford, and had Wilhelmina blocked from her attempts, first at Bradford's office, and at the Meade Black & White Ball, where Bradford told Claire their marriage was over when she murdered Fey after Wilhelmina announced to the audience the wedding was back on after Bradford wanted to postpone it.

She later gets arrested moments shortly after reconciling with Bradford, who was in a hospital after he had a heart attack during the ill-fated wedding, and he tells her she was the only one he had ever loved. He dies as she was being driven back to prison.

Upon Bradford's death she legally became CEO of Meade Publishing and Chairman of the Board at Meade Publishing taking complete control of the MEADE empire (which she did behind bars), she immediately has Wilhelmina Slater fired as creative director at MODE, a move that would fuel her rival to launch a competitor, Slater.

In the episode Odor in the Court, as Claire goes to trial for murdering Fey, some new evidence surfaces in the Love Dungeon, along with a bottle of perfume Claire gives to Betty for safekeeping during the trial. Fey's diary reveals in an attempt to kill Claire, Fey had sent a bottle of poisoned perfume to Bradford to give to Claire as a "souvenir" that would drive her to madness and kill her. By a stroke of fate, Claire's insanity resulted in Fey's own death instead. However, Amanda chooses to withhold this evidence as she blames Claire for killing her mother. After Betty nearly kills herself with the perfume, and after Amanda is convinced to hand over the evidence, Claire Meade is found not guilty and freed. Therefore, MODE is now back in her control.

However, Claire's re-entry into society has been difficult, especially for Daniel and Alexis, who were growing tired of having her stay with them even though she still has her family estate to go back to. After being sent off to do some activities paid for by her children, Claire tells Daniel and Alexis she plans to start a magazine for people 50 and Older called "Hot Flash", with Claire as the Editor-In-Chief.

It was later learned that Claire had an affair with Calvin Hartley, the billionaire who stepped in to bail out the company after Connor Owens took off with the Meade fortune. Calvin is also Matt Hartley's father. However, their relationship would result in a son, Tyler, whom unknown to Calvin, was put up for adoption by Claire in South Dakota. After Daniel finds out about the affair and Calvin fears that having the affair would tear their families apart, Claire decided to search for her son. Claire does finally make contact with Tyler and finally meets him without letting him know that she was his birth mother. But after she leaves knowing that he had a good life, Tyler discovers a $2000 tip and an envelope that had Claire's name on it.

Tyler tracks Claire down, and the two bond as mother and son. However, she lies to him about the identity of his father. This is unintentionally exposed by Daniel, resulting in Tyler becoming resentful of The Meades (with the help of Wilhelmina). He holds Claire at gunpoint, but she is saved by Wilhelmina, who takes the gun from Tyler, being shot in the process.

Wilhelmina recovers and decides not to name Tyler as her assailant, instead insisting she accidentally shot herself. She assures Claire that they "are good", finally ending the feud.
 

Ugly Betty characters
Fictional characters from New York City
Fictional murderers
Fictional socialites
Fictional prison escapees
Fictional alcohol abusers
Fictional magazine editors
Television characters introduced in 2006

fr:Liste des personnages d'Ugly Betty